The Isle of Man Incinerator was designed by Savage & Chadwick Architects and has an unusual shape and design, the stack of which is designed to represent a Viking sail. SUEZ Recycling and Recovery UK was awarded the contract to design build and operate the incinerator by the Isle of Man Government. The incinerator is located on an old disused landfill and has a capacity to treat 60,000 tonnes of municipal waste in addition to clinical and animal waste. In order to accomplish this the facility actually incorporates two separate incinerators. The facility uses moving grate technology.

The incinerator was used as a location in the filming of the 2006 film Stormbreaker.

See also

List of incinerators in the UK
Kirklees Incinerator

References

External links
Sita- Isle of Man Incinerator Information

Incinerators
Waste power stations in the United Kingdom
Buildings and structures in the Isle of Man